"Do It, Try It" is a song by French electronic music band M83. The track was first released on 1 March 2016 as a single from the group's seventh studio album, Junk.

Charts

References

2016 singles
M83 (band) songs
2016 songs
Mute Records singles